Frequent flyer may refer to:

 Frequent Flyer (film), a 1996 made-for-TV movie
 Frequent flyer program, a system of rewards offered by airlines
 Frequent flyer program (Guantanamo), a sleep deprivation technique